Canterbury Girls is the fourth studio album by American duo Lily & Madeleine. It was released on February 22, 2019 through New West Records.

Critical reception
Canterbury Girls received generally favorable reviews according to Metacritic, with a score of 80/100 based on four reviews.

Accolades

Canterbury Girls is nominated for the Album Of The Year Award at the Pop Awards 2020.

Track listing

Charts

References

2019 albums
New West Records albums
Lily & Madeline albums